The Fabian Window is a stained-glass window depicting the founders of the Fabian Society,
designed by George Bernard Shaw.  The window was stolen from Beatrice Webb House in Dorking in 1978 and reappeared at Sotheby's in 2005.  It was restored to display in the Shaw Library at the London School of Economics in 2006 at a ceremony presided over by then-Prime-Minister Tony Blair, emphasising New Labour's intellectual debt to the Fabians.

Design and construction
The stained glass window was designed by George Bernard Shaw in 1910 as a commemoration of the Fabian Society, and shows fellow Society members Sidney Webb and Edward R. Pease, among others, helping to build 'the new world'. Four Fabians, Beatrice and Sidney Webb, Graham Wallas, and George Bernard Shaw founded the London School of Economics with the money left to the Fabian Society by Henry Hutchinson.  Supposedly the decision was made at a breakfast party on 4 August 1894. Artist Caroline Townshend (cousin of Shaw's wife Charlotte Payne-Townshend and daughter of Fabian and Suffragette Emily Townshend) created the Fabian window, according to Shaw's design in 1910. Also included in the window besides Shaw and Townshend themselves, were other prominent Fabians such as H. G. Wells, Annie Besant, Graham Wallas, Hubert Bland, Edith Nesbit, Sydney Olivier, Oliver Lodge, Leonard Woolf, and Emmeline Pankhurst.

The window explicitly reflects the goal of the Fabian Society to portray an outward role contrary to its real character, i.e. to use deception in pursuing its ultimate aim . Specifically, a Wolf in Sheep's Clothing is the image which appears in the shield above the world being wrought in the Fabian mold. This biblical reference comes from the New Testament and a sermon by Jesus warning that false prophets come in sheep's clothing, but are actually ravening wolves. Authors such as G. Edward Griffin, in his book The Creature from Jekyll Island, have given voice to the reality that this shield image highlights the distinguishing feature of the Fabians as compared to the communists, in that the Fabians desire to create a socialist state using subversive tactics, as opposed to the communist method of revolution and violence.

For whatever reason, Shaw never collected the window from her workshop. The belief is that it remained there until 1947, when Mrs Townsend's niece Eva Bourne, also a stained glass artist, presented it to Beatrice Webb House, Holmbury St Mary, near Dorking. This was the year the house was formally opened by the Webb Memorial Trust as a conference and educational venue for the Labour party and the Fabian Society, officially opened by Clement Attlee, who also unveiled the Fabian Window at LSE, having been a former lecturer.

Theft and recovery

The window was subsequently stolen from the house in 1978 and surfaced in Phoenix, Arizona, soon after but then disappeared again until it suddenly appeared for sale at Sotheby's in July 2005. The Webb Memorial Trust re-purchased it and have now loaned it to the London School of Economics (LSE) to sit alongside the painting of LSE founders Sidney and Beatrice Webb by William Nicholson in the School's Shaw Library.

Comments

Tony Blair
Tony Blair spoke about the remarkable way the Fabians influenced the Labour party, not just in its creation but also in its economic, political and intellectual development.
Despite all the very obvious differences in policy and attitude and positioning... a lot of the values that the Fabians and George Bernard Shaw stood for would be very recognisable, at least I hope they would, in today's Labour party. One of the things I think they were best at was being utterly iconoclastic about the traditional thinking that governed our country and indeed constantly, whenever a piece of conventional wisdom came out, they questioned that conventional wisdom in its fundamentals, and did so with remarkable success.

Howard Davies
Director of LSE Howard Davies said: "It is a great honour for the School to have this piece of national heritage on campus. The window will be a visible reminder to students, staff and visitors of the School's historical links with Shaw, the Webbs and other Fabians, whose ideas continue to influence our thinking about society, economics and politics."

References

External links
The Fabian Window : A piece of Fabian history was installed in the School this April. Accessed 2015-09-22
A piece of Fabian history unveiled at LSE London School of Economics webpage showing an image of the window. Accessed April 1012
Fabian Society Official website
The History of the Fabian Society  by Edward R. Pease, its secretary for 25 years; from Project Gutenberg
Catalogue of the Fabian Society archives held at the London School of Economics

Social democracy
Democratic socialism
London School of Economics
Fabian Society
Victorian era
History of the Labour Party (UK)